Sergey Aleksandrovich Zhigarev (also spelled Sergey Zhigaryov) (born 25 June 1969) is a Russian politician. He was a deputy of the 7th State Duma of the Russian Federation until 2021. He had been elected to the 6th State Duma of the Russian Federation in 2011 as a representative of the Shchyolkovo constituency, and was re-elected in 2016.

Biography 
Zhigarev was born in Moscow. He graduated from the Financial University under the Government of the Russian Federation with the degree Candidate of Economic Sciences in 2005.

Prior to election to the State Duma, Zhigarev was a deputy of the Moscow Oblast Duma.

State Duma of the Russian Federation
In 2011, Zhigarev was elected as a deputy in the State Duma, the lower house of the Federal Assembly of Russia, as a representative for the Shchelkovsky constituency in Moscow. He was elected to a second term commencing 18 September 2016. He was also the chairman of the State Duma Committee on Economic Policy, Industry, Innovative Development and Entrepreneurship.

In November, 2015, Zhigarev stated that the development of a United States missile defense in Europe is the greatest threat to Russia, and that the United States itself was the main threat to its NATO allies. At the time, he was deputy chairman of the State Duma Committee on Defense. He has also expressed concern about the expansion of NATO.

Links
Personal web site.

References 

Living people
Liberal Democratic Party of Russia politicians
Politicians from Moscow
21st-century Russian politicians
1969 births
Financial University under the Government of the Russian Federation alumni
Sixth convocation members of the State Duma (Russian Federation)
Seventh convocation members of the State Duma (Russian Federation)